Andrew F. Scott House is a historic home located at Richmond, Wayne County, Indiana.  It was built in 1858, and is a two-story, cubic, Italianate style brick dwelling.  It has a hipped roof topped by a cupola and kitchen wing.  It features a projecting pedimented central entrance bay flanked by one-story verandahs with decorated posts.  From 1977 to 2004, it was owned by the Wayne County Historical Museum and operated as a historic house museum.

It was listed on the National Register of Historic Places in 1975. It is located in the Starr Historic District.

References

External links

Historic American Buildings Survey in Indiana
Houses on the National Register of Historic Places in Indiana
Italianate architecture in Indiana
Houses completed in 1858
Buildings and structures in Richmond, Indiana
National Register of Historic Places in Wayne County, Indiana